Spelter is a zinc–lead alloy that ages to resemble bronze, but is softer and has a lower melting point. The name can also refer to a copper–zinc alloy (a brass) used for brazing, or to pure zinc.

Etymology 
In his etymology of the English language, 19th-century philologist Walter William Skeat speculated that the word pewter might have been derived from spelter.

Zinc–lead spelter 
An inexpensive alloy that is easily cast and worked, spelter was used from the 1860s in the manufacture of candlesticks, clock cases, tableware, and light fixtures. In the early 20th century, sculptors such as Jacques Limousin used spelter heavily in their manufacture of Art Nouveau and Art Deco figurines and other ornaments. 

Spelter is relatively soft and brittle. It can be distinguished from bronze by scratching its patina: untarnished spelter is white, while bronze is yellow.

The speltering process
Brass was made using a cementation process but this was replaced by speltering, the direct alloying of copper and zinc metal which was introduced to Europe in the 16th century.

Other uses 
Brasses containing zinc may be termed spelter, as may zinc ingots formed by smelting.

See also

References

External links 
 
 German Art Deco Spelter Lamp

Zinc
Zinc alloys
Lead alloys
Brass